Shripad Yesso Naik (born 4 October 1952) is an Indian politician serving as the current Minister of State for Tourism and Ports, Shipping and Waterways of India in office 7 July 2021 (in Second Modi ministry). He was the former Union Minister of State for Health and Family Welfare. He is the Member of Parliament from North Goa constituency, representing the Bharatiya Janata Party.

Early life
Shripaad Naik was born on 4 October 1952 at Adpai village, North Goa District, Goa.

Political career

In 1999, Naik was elected to the 13th Lok Sabha from North Goa constituency in Goa. As of 2019, he has held his seat in this constituency winning in 2004, 2009, 2014 and 2019 elections. As of 2019, he is a member of the 17th Lok Sabha. In 2014 Lok Sabha Election, he won with a margin of 105,000 votes which is very high for a small state of Goa.

Further, as advised by the Prime Minister Narendra Modi, the President has appointed Naik as Minister for Culture and Tourism (Independent Charge) in the 16th Lok Sabha.

Naik was appointed Minister of State (Independent Charge) of the Ministry of AYUSH, Government of India, on 9 November 2014. On 25 March 2016, Naik publicly stated he had access to research which proved that diseases such as cancer could be cured by yoga. He further stated that his Ministry was a year away from granting an endorsement to such techniques and research. The statement was challenged by medical researchers, scholars and doctors, who advocated caution in claiming a cure to cancer on the basis of unproven and unpublished research with no scientific evidence.

Naik continued as Minister of State (Independent Charge) for AYUSH and was appointed Minister of State for Defence on 31 May 2019.

Awards
He received the Samaraj Ratna Award on 18 August 2016.

Accident
He met with an accident on the evening of 11 January 2021 in Ankola, Karwar district, Karnataka, after the driver of the car en route from Yellapur to Gokarna in the state is said to have lost control at the wheel on the ghat section, causing the car to go turtle into a ditch. Also due to the accident, his wife and personal secretary suffered grievous injuries. Police later confirmed they succumbed to their injuries whilst undergoing treatment to recover them in the hospital.

 His wife died in this accident.

References

|-

|-

|-

|-

External links

 Detailed Profile: Shripad Yesso Naik in india.gov.in website

Living people
1952 births
People from North Goa district
Members of the Goa Legislative Assembly
Bharatiya Janata Party politicians from Goa
India MPs 2004–2009
India MPs 1999–2004
India MPs 2009–2014
Lok Sabha members from Goa
India MPs 2014–2019
Tourism ministers of India
Union ministers of state of India with independent charge
Narendra Modi ministry
India MPs 2019–present
Culture Ministers of India